Sally and Saint Anne is a 1952 American comedy film directed by Rudolph Maté and starring Ann Blyth, Edmund Gwenn and John McIntire.

Plot
Sally O’Moyne is a schoolgirl who lives with three generations of an eccentric Irish family, including her Grandpa Pat Ryan, who pretends to be close to death. One day at school she can’t find her lunch pail so she prays to Saint Anne, asking for her intercession. When her lunch pail is returned to her, Sally begins to believe Saint Anne is performing miracles for her, and her neighbors ask her to pray to the saint for their requests. A few years later land-grabbing Alderman McCarthy wants the O’Mayne’s off of their property, and Sally turns to Saint Anne to help them keep their house.

Cast
 Ann Blyth as Sally O'Moyne  
 Edmund Gwenn as Grandpa Pat Ryan  
 John McIntire as Alderman Percival Xavier 'Goldtooth' McCarthy  
 Gregg Palmer as Johnny Evans  
 Hugh O'Brian as Danny O'Moyne  
 Jack Kelly as Mike O'Moyne  
 Frances Bavier as Mrs. Kitty 'Mom' O'Moyne  
 Otto Hulett as Pop O'Moyne  
 Kathleen Hughes as Lois Foran  
 George Mathews as Father Kennedy  
 Lamont Johnson as Willie O'Moyne  
 King Donovan as Hymie Callahan, Trainer

References

External links
 
 

1952 films
1952 comedy films
American comedy films
Films directed by Rudolph Maté
American black-and-white films
Universal Pictures films
1950s English-language films
1950s American films